Time Trap may refer to:

 Time Trap, a 1970 science fiction novel by Keith Laumer
 Time Trap, a 1976 science fiction novel for children by Nicholas Fisk
 "Time Trap", a song by Built to Spill from their 1999 album Keep It Like a Secret
 "The Time Trap", the twelfth episode of the first season of Star Trek: The Animated Series
 Time Trap (adventure), a role-playing game adventure published by TSR
 The Time Trap (comics), the ninth comic book in the Blake and Mortimer series
 Time Trap (film), a 2017 American science fiction, action and adventure film
 Time Trap, the tenth and final book in the Bionicle Adventures series, published in 2005

See also 
 Timetrap, a Star Trek novel